Yehuda Gaulan was the Israeli Ambassador to Greece from 1970 until 1974; minister to Denmark in 1954, Consul General in Montreal from 1954 until 1957 and Ambassador to Finland from 1960 to 1964.

Gaulan also served as Israel’s Chief of Protocol.

References

Ambassadors of Israel to Greece
Ambassadors of Israel to Denmark
Ambassadors of Israel to Finland
Israeli consuls

Possibly living people
Year of birth missing